Robert Ayres may refer to:

 Robert M. Ayres (1898–1977), American architect
 Robert Ayres (actor) (1914–1968), American actor
 Robert Ayres (scientist) (born 1932), American scientist
 Bob Ayres (rugby league) (1914–1993), British rugby league player
 Bob Ayres (born 1953), American entrepreneur

See also
 Robert Ayers (born 1985), American football player